Jauhar Saleem is a Pakistani career diplomat known for soft diplomacy. He assumed charge as Acting Foreign Secretary on Sep 30, 2022. He also served as Pakistan's ambassador to Italy from April 2020-September 2022.

Early life
Jauhar Saleem, a career diplomat of the Foreign Service of Pakistan born on 10 April 1963. His hometown is Lahore, Pakistan.

Education
Jauhar Saleem was educated at GCU Lahore, University of Pennsylvania, Johns Hopkins University and Georgetown University.

Career
Saleem is currently serving as Acting Foreign Secretary. He served on various assignments in the Pakistan Foreign Office as well as Pakistan's diplomatic missions abroad, including Brazil, Turkey, USA, and Croatia. Prior to his appointment as ambassador in 2007, he was also the Director General for Europe and Eurasia in the Foreign Office, Islamabad.

Bosnia and Herzegovina
Saleem was the Ambassador of Pakistan to Bosnia & Herzegovina from 2008 to 2011.

Bahrain
Saleem served as the Ambassador at the Embassy of Pakistan in Bahrain from 2011 to 2014.

Foreign Office Islamabad
Saleem is currently serving as the Acting Foreign Secretary. He has also served as Additional Foreign Secretary (Administration) and Director-General Foreign Service Academy Islamabad.

Germany
He was appointed as Pakistan's Ambassador to Germany in October 2015 and served there from 2016 to 2020.

Italy
From April 2020 till September 2022, he served as Pakistan's ambassador to Italy with concurrent accreditation to Slovenia, Albania and San Marino and took charge in April 2020.

References 

Living people
Ambassadors of Pakistan to Albania
Ambassadors of Pakistan to Bahrain
Ambassadors of Pakistan to Bosnia and Herzegovina
Ambassadors of Pakistan to Croatia
Ambassadors of Pakistan to Germany
Ambassadors of Pakistan to Italy
Ambassadors of Pakistan to San Marino
Ambassadors of Pakistan to Slovenia
Government College University, Lahore alumni
Paul H. Nitze School of Advanced International Studies alumni
Year of birth missing (living people)